Ladji Mallé (born 12 December 2001) is a Malian football forward.

Career

FK Pohronie
Mallé was announced as a signing of Pohronie in February 2021 and he appeared in some winter preparatory friendly games, exhibiting technical skills in his appearances.

Mallé made his Fortuna Liga debut during a home match at pod Dubňom in a fixture against Nitra. Mallé came on in the 60th minute to replace Petr Galuška with score at 1:1, following first-half strikes by Adler Da Silva and Kilian Pagliuca for the away side. Pohronie went on to win the game through further strike by Andrej Štrba and Da Silva's late counterattack goal. He appeared regularly in the following weeks as a substitute for Pohronie, including a match during an away fixture against reigning champions of Slovan Bratislava, replacing Bernard Petrák in the last five minutes of the narrow 0:1 defeat.

Personal life
Mallé is a native speaker of Bambara and French. He is also fluent in English. He originates from a ten-member household from the outskirts of Bamako. His two elder brothers are also professional footballers: Aly Mallé currently plays for Yeni Malatyaspor and represented Mali at youth international level and Amara Mallé currently plays for AS Bamako and represented Mali in one international match against Guinea in 2013. Per his social media communication, Mallé adheres to Islam.

References

External links
 
 FK Pohronie official club profile
 Futbalnet profile
 Footballdatabase profile

2001 births
Living people
People from Bamako
Malian Muslims
Malian footballers
Malian expatriate footballers
Association football forwards
AS Bamako players
Malian Première Division players
FK Pohronie players
Las Vegas Lights FC players
Slovak Super Liga players
Malian expatriate sportspeople in Slovakia
Expatriate footballers in Slovakia
Francophone people
21st-century Malian people
USL Championship players